Independents of Fuerteventura (IF) is a political force in Fuerteventura (Canary Islands) which first contested the 1983 elections and that was formally registered as a party on 17 May 1984.

References

Political parties in the Canary Islands
Political parties established in 1983
1983 establishments in Spain